Luraine Tansey (née Collins) (January 29, 1918 – June 18, 2014) was an American slide librarian who created the first Universal Slide Classification System in 1969 with Wendell Simons.

Life 
Tansey worked to develop a "universal" slide classification scheme that would serve the needs of both catalogers and patrons.  Co-authored by Wendell Simons, it was published in 1969 under the title, A slide classification system for the organization and automatic indexing of interdisciplinary collections of slides and pictures.  Created mostly during her tenure at the University of California, Santa Cruz in the late 1960s-early 1970s, this system is still in use at UCSC and other institutions and is known as the Tansey or Santa Cruz system. This system was also built with computer indexing in mind.

Tansey worked with the College Art Association (CAA) for the benefit of librarians and image librarians. Her work contributed to the eventual founding of two professional societies, the Art Libraries Society of North America (ARLIS/NA) and the Visual Resources Association (VRA). In 1993 she received both the VRA and ARLIS/NA's Distinguished Service Awards. In 1993, Tansey underwrote the VRA Travel Awards Program; several Luraine Tansey Travel Awards are still awarded each year.

Luraine Tansey worked on several lectures and publications  throughout the 1970’s. Her work “Potential Uses of Slide Classification Data Bases in Art History,” was in 1st international Conference of Art History  Volume II in Pisa, Italy in 1978. “Classification of Research Photographs and Slides,” was published in Library Trends, January 1975. Slide Collection Index Application was published in International Business Machines, 1973.

She also assisted her husband, Dr. Richard Tansey, with editing five editions of Gardner's Art Through the Ages as a bibliographer, and she worked on the index in Cohen’s Study Guide for Art through the Ages.

Luraine Tansey had a multidisciplinary approach to the visual world. She was a talented classical violinist who could pick up a tune and accompany anyone. She was an avid photographer, particularly of nature, and was acquainted with several of the major West Coast photographers including Imogen Cunningham, Roy Partridge, and Edward Weston. She was a precocious illustrator of human character and action and a committed painter of landscapes in California and New England. From a young age she was interested in how materials and images could be regarded and transformed to impart knowledge. Her father, Merle Collins, had a tool shop where he made all sorts of things from lamps and desks to toys. He taught her how to craft things out of wood, clay, paper, leather, metals, and a range of things found in nature.  Luraine internalized a fascination with making things which she shared with her family. This transformative visual sensibility is part of the inspirational basis for her son, Mark Tansey’s painting, “The Bricoleur’s daughter.” Although her breakthrough image classification system and her work with the Visual Resources Association are what she is best known for, her lifelong passion was early childhood education. Throughout her life she was assembling and updating hundreds of pages of photographs, advice and analysis of how to educate very young children through attention to nature, attention to how things are made and the making of things “out of nothing.” Although she never completed the work, she developed and used its precepts in the education of her children and grandchildren.

Tansey was born in  Manhattan, Kansas. Tansey had four sons, one of whom is Mark Tansey, a well-known artist who can be categorized as postmodern, but would qualify that label.

She died June 18, 2014 in Bristol, Rhode Island.

References

External links 
 ARLIS VRD Biography
 Obituary

American librarians
American women librarians
People from Manhattan, Kansas
University of California, Santa Cruz faculty
1918 births
2014 deaths
21st-century American women